This is a list of finalists for the 1921 Archibald Prize for portraiture. (listed is Artist – Title) As the images are copyright, an external link to an image has been listed where available.

See also 
Next year: List of Archibald Prize 1922 finalists
List of Archibald Prize winners
Lists of Archibald Prize finalists

References

1921
Archibald
Archibald
Archibald Prize 1921
Archibald Prize 1921